Vladimir Valjarević (born 1973, Tuzla, SR Bosnia and Herzegovina, Yugoslavia), is a Serbian/American concert pianist and pedagogue, currently residing in New York City, United States.

Career
Valjarevic is on the piano faculty at the Mannes School of Music and Mason Gross School of the Arts at Rutgers University. He closely collaborates with his former teacher, Pavlina Dokovska, having been her teaching assistant for over a decade. His students have performed worldwide as recitalists, concerto soloists, and chamber musicians. As part of his outreach activities, he conducts piano master classes semi-annually under the auspices of Southwest Virginia Community College. In the summers, he serves on the piano and the chamber music faculties at Beijing International Music Festival and Academy in China, in addition to his teaching work at Round Top Festival in Texas, International Institute for Young Musicians in Kansas, and "Pianophoria!" in New York City. During his tenure as head of the Mannes Prep Piano Department from 2013 to 2016, he curated a variety of programs and incentives for students. Valjarevic initiated the development of the secondary piano curriculum at Mannes College, and organized the program of studies for piano pedagogy and piano literature courses at Mannes and Rutgers. He serves as the chamber music coordinator at Beijing International Music Festival and Institute in China and the assistant artistic director at the Southwest Virginia Festival for the Arts.

As a performer, Valjarevic has appeared at the National Center for the Performing Arts in Beijing, Sumida Triphony Chamber Hall in Tokyo, Leiszhalle in Hamburg, Conservatory Hall in Geneva, Heilig-Kreuz-Kirche in Berlin, Concert Hall "Bulgaria" in Sofia, Conservatory of Music in San Juan, Puerto Rico, the Manchester Music Festival in Vermont, the Southwest Virginia Festival for the Arts, French and Swiss Embassies in Washington, D.C. In New York, he has performed at Bargemusic, "Concerts at One" at Trinity Church, the "Meet the Virtuoso" at the 92nd Street Y, the Weill Recital Hall at Carnegie Hall, Merkin Hall, Steinway Hall, the Yamaha Salon, The United Nations, and the New School's Tishman Auditorium, among others. Committed to exploration of the contemporary repertoire, Valjarevic has worked under the direction of various composers and took part in numerous world premieres, including the compositions by Aleksandra Vrebalov and Dick Hyman with the Knoxville Symphony Orchestra at the Southwest Virginia Festival for the Arts.  In addition, he appeared in the European premiere of Cage's dance drama "Four Walls" in Berlin and then Hamburg.  Valjarevic has performed extensively as a member of  Kaleidos Duo, with violinist Miroslav Hristov.

Born in Bosnia and Herzegovina, Valjarevic received his initial music education in Tuzla as a student of Planinka Jurisic-Atic.  He came to New York City on a scholarship from the Mannes School of Music, where he earned bachelor's and master's degrees with honors, garnering the Marian Marcus Wahl Performance Award at graduation. His principal teachers were Pavlina Dokovska and Vladimir Feltsman. Valjarevic received a doctoral degree from the Mason Gross School of the Arts at Rutgers University, where he was a student of Susan Starr, and a recipient of the Saldarini Scholarship Award. Upon graduation, he was presented with the Elizabeth Wyckoff Durham Award for Excellence in Keyboard Studies. After winning a Fulbright Scholarship and Swiss Arts Government Grant, Valjarevic studied at the Geneva Conservatory in Switzerland under the tutelage of Pascal Devoyon. While in Geneva, he received chamber music instruction from Jean Jacques Balet and clavichord lessons from Nicole Hostettler at the Centre de Musique Ancienne.  He has participated in Master Classes with Naum Shtarkman, Gaby Casadesus, Gyorgy Sandor, Jerome Lowenthal, Lilian Kallir, Eteri Andjaparidze, and Lydia Kouteva, and in festivals such as IMS Prussia Cove in England, the American Conservatory in Fontainebleau, France, the Apeldoorn Festival in The Netherlands, the International Festival-Institute at Round Top in Texas, The International Keyboard Institute and the Beethoven Institute in New York, Kneisel Hall in Maine (as a recipient of Artur Balsam Scholarship). As a soloist and chamber musician, he has won numerous prizes at National Competitions in the former Yugoslavia as well as at the "Citta di Stresa" and "Citta di Marsala" International Competitions for the Young in Italy. He has recorded for Labor Records, Romeo Records, Centaur Records, and MSR Classics.

References
Biography at the Mannes School of Music website

External links
Vladimir Valjarevic's home page

1973 births
Living people
Mannes School of Music alumni
Rutgers University alumni
Yugoslav emigrants to the United States
Musicians from Tuzla
Serbs of Bosnia and Herzegovina
American classical pianists
Male classical pianists
American male pianists
21st-century classical pianists
21st-century American male musicians
21st-century American pianists